Edwin Bailey Elliott FRS (born 1 June 1851, Oxford, England;
died 21 July 1937 in Oxford, England) was a mathematician who worked on invariant theory. In 1892 he was appointed Waynflete Professor of Pure Mathematics at Oxford. He was elected a fellow of the Royal Society in 1891. He wrote the book An introduction to the algebra of quantics, on invariant theory .

Publications

References

Bibliography

Deaths. The Times, Jul 23, 1937; Issue 47744; pg. 1; col A

English mathematicians
People educated at Magdalen College School, Oxford
Fellows of the Royal Society
1851 births
1937 deaths
Waynflete Professors of Pure Mathematics